Class 08 may refer to:

British Rail Class 08
PKP class EP08